The Kilburn White Horse, is a hill figure cut into the hillside in the North York Moors National Park  near Kilburn in North Yorkshire, England.

Located on the southern flank of Sutton Bank, near Roulston Scar at the edge of the Hambleton table-land, it faces south-south-west and is visible from some distance, particularly from the East Coast Main Line railway south of Thirsk, and from the A19.

Sutton Bank, geologically, is formed of sandstone and the horse was created by removing the topsoil and exposing the underlying rock and covering it with white limestone chips. It was created in November 1857, and some accounts state that it was done by schoolmaster John Hodgson and his pupils, together with local volunteers. A tablet erected at the car park below it reads, "The Kilburn 'White Horse' -- This figure was cut in 1857 on the initiative of Thomas Taylor, a native of Kilburn. In 1925 a restoration fund was subscribed by the readers of the Yorkshire Evening Post and the residue of £100 was invested to provide for the triennial grooming of the figure."

However, Morris Marples in his 1949 book gives Thomas Taylor the credit for being the prime mover: a native of Kilburn, he was a buyer for a London provision merchant. He seems to have attended celebrations at the Uffington White Horse in 1857, and he was inspired to give his home village a similar example. Thirty-three men were involved in cutting it, and 6 tons (6.1 metric tonnes) of lime were used to whiten the exposed rock.
Nowadays a car park is provided below the white horse and there is a footpath ascending past it and crossing immediately above it. The image itself is now formed of off-white limestone chips, but the steep gradient of the hillside, especially at the horse's breast and forelegs, have led to slumping and retention boards have been fixed to restrain this.

The footpath offers a scenic view. The car park is located on a steeply graded minor road between Kilburn village and the Sutton Bank National Park Centre on the A170 road, and the best view of the white horse itself is from the Bagby road; benches are provided at the best vantage point to allow leisurely observation.

During World War II the horse was covered over to prevent it from becoming a conspicuous navigation landmark for enemy bombers.

The horse featured in the launch video for Channel 3 North East, the rebranded version of regional ITV station Tyne Tees Television, in September 1996.

The horse was repainted in 2014. The Kilburn White Horse Association, run by volunteers, handed the site to Forestry England in 2018. In 2022, the horse was resprayed at a cost of £20,000.

See also
 Cherhill White Horse
 Uffington White Horse
 Westbury White Horse
 Litlington White Horse

References

External links 

 Kilburn White Horse
 Yorkshire Guide - A Walk around the Kilburn White Horse
 Panoramic view of Kilburn White Horse

Protected areas of North Yorkshire
White horses (hill figures) in England
Yorkshire folklore